In 2015, Richard D James, who releases music under aliases including Aphex Twin, anonymously uploaded hundreds of demos and unreleased tracks to the music sharing site SoundCloud. James said he released the music to relieve his family of the pressure to release his archives after he dies. He added more tracks in 2020. As of 2022, 296 tracks had been uploaded.

History 
In January 2015, James began anonymously uploading demos to the music sharing site SoundCloud. Some tracks dated to the late 1980s or early 1990s. He tagged the first track with the comment: "like early aphex but I'd never heard of him when I wrote all these tracks im going to be uploading".

Over the course of several days, James deleted and relaunched the page several times with different URLs, possibly after reaching the upload limit for free SoundCloud accounts. Over the course of several months. he uploaded 269 tracks, including early versions of tracks later included on the 2016 EP Cheetah. The user page briefly read "I AM NOT RICHARD", with a link to a YouTube channel containing all the tracks. In May, the tracks were removed. James uploaded more tracks in April 2020.

According to the Pitchfork journalist Philip Sherburne, the tracks were made in different periods with different equipment, but bore the hallmarks of James's work: "You can hear the same machines, the same processes, and above all, the same ideas — if this isn't James, then it's a musician who's every bit his peer, and what are the chances of one of those going undiscovered for all these years?" Mike Paradinas, one of James's collaborators, vouched for the music's authenticity. In 2017, two of the tracks, "3 GERALD REMIX" and "24 TSIM 2", were compiled on a record sold exclusively at a Michigan record store.

The Guardian journalist Stuart Aitken argued that James's experiments with SoundCloud and other digital media should encourage musicians to explore the creative opportunities of the internet. In 2019, James explained his reasons for the release: "I've got all this music and I thought if I died what the fuck would my kids do? What would my wife do? They'd get really stressed out and they wouldn’t know what to do with it all. So I just thought I'd give it away, then they don't have to think about it."

References 

Aphex Twin
Demos
Aphex Twin songs
Songs written by Aphex Twin